Kazimierz "Kaz" Sokołowski (born 11 February 1963) is a retired Polish football defender and later manager.

He was a squad member for the 1980 UEFA European Under-18 Championship and the 1981 FIFA World Youth Championship. He was later capped twice for Poland and upon transferring to Tromsø IL ahead of the 1992 season, he emigrated to Norway. Settling in Asker, his son Tomasz Sokolowski was capped for Norway.

As a head coach Sokołowski led Asker to promotion to the 1996 3. divisjon and the 1999 2. divisjon, and lost promotion to the 2000 1. divisjon only in extra time on the last matchday.

Asker's women's team played on the first tier, and Sokołowski was co-head coach with Eli Landsem in 2002. He returned in 2004 as assistant coach under Tomi Markovski. Both also worked at the Norwegian School of Elite Sport (NTG). In mid-2004 he also became player developer in another NTG cooperation club, Lyn.

In Januar 2005 he became caretaker manager of Lyn, after Espen Olafsen survived and lost his family in the 2004 Thailand tsunami. In April 2005 Henning Berg was hired as manager, and Sokolowski left Lyn since his son Tomasz was a squad member. However, Sokolowski would later work as Henning Berg's assistant in several clubs.

After rounding off 2005 in the coaching staff of Lyn's junior team, who became runners-up in the Norwegian U-20 Cup, he became Sandefjord's assistant under Tor Thodesen ahead of the 2006 season.

Thodesen was sacked in May 2008. After being caretaker manager for a couple of weeks, Sokolowski continued as assistant until joining Vålerenga as player developed ahead of the 2009 season. After suffering a tumor on the adrenal gland Sokolowski was hospitalized for an extended time, but returned to the pitch in January 2010 and was especially credited with the development of striker Mohammed Abdellaoue. In the summer of 2013 Sokolowski was tempted to sign for SK Brann as assistant, where his son Tomasz played.

In 2014 Sokolowski started a tenure as the assistant manager for Henning Berg, first in Legia Warsaw, where the entire Norwegian coaching team was sacked in October 2015, later in Videoton FC, Stabæk and AC Omonia. In between Videoton and Stabæk, Sokolowski had a spell in Kongsvinger without Berg.

References

1963 births
Living people
Polish footballers
Pogoń Szczecin players
LASK players
Tromsø IL players
Asker Fotball players
Association football defenders
Poland youth international footballers
Poland international footballers
Polish expatriate footballers
Expatriate footballers in Austria
Polish expatriate sportspeople in Austria
Expatriate footballers in Norway
Polish expatriate sportspeople in Norway
Eliteserien players
Polish emigrants to Norway
Polish football managers
Lyn Fotball non-playing staff
Sandefjord Fotball non-playing staff
Vålerenga Fotball non-playing staff
SK Brann non-playing staff
Legia Warsaw non-playing staff
Stabæk Fotball non-playing staff
Expatriate football managers in Hungary
Expatriate football managers in Cyprus